Cepora aspasia is a butterfly in the  family Pieridae, found in Indonesia.

References

Pierini
Butterflies described in 1790